The Pará spiny tree rat (Mesomys stimulax) or Surinam spiny tree rat, is a spiny rat species found in Brazil.

References

Mesomys
Mammals described in 1911
Taxa named by Oldfield Thomas